Bobby Prentice (27 September 1953 – 16 September 2019) was a Scottish professional footballer who played as an outside left. 

Prentice started his senior career with Celtic, but did not make a league appearance for the club. He joined Hearts on 18 August 1973. Bobby made 209 appearances for Hearts, his last on 28 April 1979. He scored 20 goals for the club and was noted as a fast outside left.  Prentice then played for Toronto Blizzard for three seasons from 1979 to 1981 (0 goals in 29 appearances), plus one indoor season (28 goals in 18 appearances). After playing indoor football for Baltimore Blast from 1981 to 1983 (24 goals in 59 appearances) and Buffalo Stallions in 1984 (3 goals in 21 appearances), Prentice returned to Scotland in 1984 and lived in Dalkeith.

He played for Scotland under-23s on four occasions, scoring in a match against Denmark.

References

External links 

NASL/MISL stats

2019 deaths
1953 births
People from Douglas Water
Association football wingers
Scottish footballers
Celtic F.C. players
Heart of Midlothian F.C. players
Scottish Football League players
Scottish expatriate footballers
Expatriate soccer players in Canada
Toronto Blizzard (1971–1984) players
North American Soccer League (1968–1984) players
North American Soccer League (1968–1984) indoor players
Scottish Football League representative players
Footballers from South Lanarkshire
Scotland under-23 international footballers
Scottish expatriate sportspeople in Canada
Buffalo Stallions players
Baltimore Blast (1980–1992) players
Major Indoor Soccer League (1978–1992) players
Expatriate soccer players in the United States
Scottish expatriate sportspeople in the United States